Gábor Kemény may refer to:

Gábor Kemény (politician, 1830–1888), Hungarian politician
Gábor Kemény (politician, 1910–1946), Hungarian politician